This is a list of notable people including natives and residents of Orlando, Florida.

A

AK1200, musician, record producer
Maurice Allen (golfer) (born 1981), professional golfer
Cody Allen (born 1988), Major League Baseball pitcher
Kiradech Aphibarnrat (born 1989), professional golfer
Chucky Atkins (born 1974), National Basketball Association player
Adam Scherr (born 1983), WWE professional wrestler, performed under the ring name 'Braun Strowman'
Ayo the Producer (born 1988), Grammy Award-winning producer

B
Lance Bass (born 1979), singer, member of boy band 'N Sync
Billy Beane (born 1962), MLB player and executive
Giselle Bellas, singer-songwriter (Originally from Miami, Florida)
Bo Bichette (born 1998), MLB player
 Kerry Blackshear Jr. (born 1997), basketball player in the Israeli Basketball Premier League
Kerlin Blaise (born 1974), NFL player
Alexa Bliss (born 1991), professional wrestler (Originally from Columbus, Ohio)
Stephanie Borowicz (c. 1977), Pennsylvania State Representative
Wayne Brady (born 1972), actor, singer, comedian, and television personality
Chaundee Brown (born 1998), NBA player for the Atlanta Hawks
Jenn Brown (born 1981), sportscaster (originally from Gainesville, Florida)
Lynda Lyon Block (1948–2002), convicted murderer known as the first woman executed in Alabama
Delta Burke (born 1956), actress, producer, author

C
Raymond Cassagnol (born 1920), Haitian-born member of the Tuskegee Airmen  
Brian Patrick Clarke (born 1952), film actor
Caskey (born 1992), rapper
Talia Castellano (1999–2013), American internet celebrity and model who was best known for her work on YouTube, became the first honorary CoverGirl in 2012
Ha Ha Clinton-Dix (born 1992), professional football player
Choo-Choo Coleman (1937–2016), MLB catcher who played for the Philadelphia Phillies and New York Mets
Cal Conley (born 1999), shortstop in the Atlanta Braves organization
Manny Coto, writer and director

D
Dream (born 1999), Minecraft YouTuber
Johnny Damon (born 1973), MLB outfielder
Marquis Daniels (born 1981), professional basketball player
Teahna Daniels (born 1997), Olympic athlete, sprinter
DJ Magic Mike (born 1964), Miami Bass artist
Sarah E. Daniels (born 1989), actress (Originally from Tallahassee, Florida)
Darryl Dawkins (1957–2015), professional basketball player
Juan Debiedma (born 1993), professional Super Smash Bros. Melee player
Paul DeJong (born 1993), MLB infielder
Neil Divine (1939–1994), stellar and planetary astrophysicist
Howie Dorough (born 1973), member of  Backstreet Boys
Ericka Dunlap (born 1981), Miss America 2004
Buddy Dyer (born 1958), mayor of Orlando
Detox Icunt (born 1985), drag queen; best known for competing on the fifth season of RuPaul's Drag Race and being a runner-up on the second season of RuPaul's Drag Race All Stars

E
Buddy Ebsen (1908–2003), actor
David Efianayi (born 1995), basketball player in the Israeli Basketball Premier League
Charles McArther Emmanuel (born 1978), son of Liberian leader Charles Taylor

F
Joey Fatone (born 1977), singer, member of boy band 'N Sync
Luis Fonsi (born 1978), singer

G
Genitorturers, industrial metal band
GlokkNine (born 2000), rapper
Drew Gooden (born 1993), YouTuber
Zack Greinke (born 1983), MLB pitcher
Eric Griffin (born 1990), basketball player for Hapoel Yossi Avrahami Eilat of the Israeli Basketball Premier League
Vaughn Grissom (born 2001), MLB player for the Atlanta Braves

H
Ashlyn Harris (born 1985), professional soccer player, two times World Cup Champion (Originally from Satellite Beach, Florida)
Adam Haseley (born 1996), professional baseball player
Sally Hogshead, author and professional speaker
Glenda Hood (born 1950), mayor of Orlando 1993–2003 (Originally from Kissimmee, Florida)
Rod Houison, musician, producer, sound engineer
Jack Hughes (born 2001), professional hockey player
Quinn Hughes (born 1999), professional hockey player
Will Hunt (born 1971), Evanescence drummer
Zora Neale Hurston (1891–1960), author, anthropologist, filmmaker

I
Augustus Invictus (born 1983), far-right political activist, attorney, blogger, white nationalist

J
Chris Johnson (basketball, born 1990) (born 1990), basketball player in the Israeli Basketball Premier League
Chris Johnson (running back) (born 1985), former NFL running back
Davey Johnson (born 1943), MLB player, manager
Karl Joseph (born 1993), professional football player

K
Brian Kendrick (born 1979), professional wrestler
Jack Kerouac (1922–1969), author, poet and painter (Originally from Lowell, Massachusetts)
Chad Kessler (born 1975), football player
Paul John Knowles (1946–1974), serial killer, rapist
Lydia Ko (born 1997), professional golfer
Ali Krieger (born 1984), professional soccer player, two-time World Cup Champion

L
Michael Lockley (born 1988), professional football player
Audrey Long (1922–2014), stage and screen actress of the 1940s and 1950s
Erickson Lubin (born 1995), professional boxer

M
Stacey Mack (born 1975), former NFL running back played for Jacksonville Jaguars and Houston Texans
Mike Maroth (born 1977), former MLB pitcher who is currently the pitching coach for the Gwinnett Stripers
Tony McCoy (born 1969), professional football player
Charlotte McKinney (born 1993), model, actress
A.J. McLean (born 1978), member of the Backstreet Boys 
Brad Miller (born 1989), Philadelphia Phillies infielder
Mandy Moore (born 1984), actress (Originally from Nashua, New Hampshire)
Jan Mulder, pianist, composer, conductor

N
Naomi (born 1987), wrestler (originally from Sanford, Florida)
Kathryn Newton (born 1997), actress
Nate Newton (born 1961), professional football player
Tim Newton (born 1963), professional football player
Marshall Warren Nirenberg (1927–2010), Nobel Prize-winning biochemist, geneticist

O
Sean O'Neal (born 1975), actor 
Kenny Omega (born 1983), professional wrestler 
Rob Oppenheim (born 1980), professional golfer

P
Robert Pierre (born 1992), Christian singer/songwriter
A. J. Pierzynski (born 1976), MLB catcher
Rene Plasencia (born 1973), Republican member of the Florida House of Representatives

R
Dot Richardson (born 1961), physician, softball Olympic gold medalist, USA Softball Hall of Fame honoree
Jean Rodríguez (born 1980), singer, songwriter, producer

S
Bryana Salaz (born 1997), American singer, actress
Tyra Sanchez, retired drag performer, winner of the second season of RuPaul's Drag Race
Warren Sapp (born 1972), professional football player
Chuck Schuldiner (1967–2001), "godfather of death metal", frontman of the metal band Death
Derrick Sharp (born 1971), American-Israeli professional basketball player
Brandon Siler (born 1985), professional football player
Mike Sims-Walker (born 1984), professional football player
Bridget Sloan (born 1992), olympic gymnast
Wesley Snipes (born 1962), film actor, producer
Scott Stapp (born 1973), rock musician
Miriam Stockley (born 1962), South African-born British singer 
Amar'e Stoudemire (born 1982), professional basketball player

T
Antonio Tarver (born 1968), professional boxer
Daniel Tosh (born 1975), comedian, host of Tosh.0 on Comedy Central
Frances Tiafoe (born 1998), tennis player (originally from Hyattsville, Maryland)
Jeannie Tirado, voice actress

V
Daniel Vogelbach (born 1992), MLB player
Jayy Von Monroe (born 1991), rock musician and ex-lead singer of Blood on the Dance Floor

W
Turner Ward (born 1965), MLB player and coach
Chris Warren (born 1988), professional basketball player
Darius Washington, Jr. (born 1985), professional basketball player
Jemile Weeks (born 1987), MLB infielder
Cosmo Wilson (born 1961), concert lighting designer
Paul Wilson (born 1973), MLB pitcher

Y
Rachel York (born 1971), actress, singer

References

Orlando, Florida
 
Orlando
Orlando, Florida-related lists